There have been various classification schemes for Southeast Asian languages (see the articles for the respective language families).

Language families
The five established major language families are:
Kra–Dai
Austronesian
Austroasiatic
Hmong–Mien
Sino-Tibetan

Isolates and small families
A number of language groups in Arunachal Pradesh traditionally considered to be Sino-Tibetan (Tibeto-Burman) may in fact constitute independent language families or isolates (Roger Blench 2011). (See Language isolates and independent language families in Arunachal.)

Potential language isolates and independent language families in Arunachal: Digaro, Hrusish (including the Miji languages), Midzu, Puroik, Siangic, and Kho-Bwa
The two Andamanese language families: Great Andamanese and Ongan
Language isolates and languages with isolate substrata of Southeast Asia: Kenaboi, Enggano, and the Philippine Negrito languages Manide and Umiray Dumagat

Macrofamilies

Several macrofamily schemes have been proposed for linking multiple language families of Southeast Asia. None of these proposals is yet accepted by mainstream comparative linguistics, though research into higher-level relationships among these languages has gained some renewed scholarly interest over the last three decades; the various hypotheses are still under investigation, and the validity of each has yet to be resolved.

 Austro-Tai links the Austronesian and Kra–Dai languages. Several current scholars, including Laurent Sagart, Stanley Starosta, Weera Ostapirat and Lawrence Reid, accept or theorize a close relationship between these families, but the specifics of the relationship remain unclear. Multiple models of the internal branching of Austro-Tai have been put forward, and Austro-Tai has been incorporated as a subgroup within some larger macrofamily schemes, e.g. in Starosta's East Asian as well as in Sagart's model of Austronesian (see below), both of which regard Kra–Dai as a subfamily within Austronesian. A few versions of Austro-Tai have included Japonic and/or the isolate Ainu as well, though these have not been met with as much acceptance.
 Miao–Dai (Kosaka 2002) is a hypothesis for a family including Miao–Yao (Hmong–Mien) and Kra–Dai.
 Sino-Austronesian (Sagart 2004, 2005) links Austro-Tai (Austronesian) with Sino-Tibetan (Tibeto-Burman).
 Austric links all of the major language families of Southeast Asia apart from Sino-Tibetan. Several variants of the Austric hypothesis have been proposed since it took shape with Paul K. Benedict's proposal (1942). Some of these also incorporate Japonic, Korean and/or Ainu. One version called the "Greater Austric" hypothesis (Bengtson 1996) includes Ainu as well as Nihali, a language isolate of India.
 The "Proto-Asian hypothesis" or "Austro-Asian" (Larish 2006) argues for lexical evidence of relationship among all of the languages typically included in Austric as well as Japanese–Korean and Sino-Tibetan.
 East Asian (Starosta 2005) covers all of these families (except Japonic, Koreanic, Ainu and Nihali) as well as Sino-Tibetan. It posits Austronesian (including Kra–Dai) as the most divergent branch, coordinate with a primary branch Sino-Tibetan–Yangzian which links Sino-Tibetan with a clade called Yangzian (or Yangtzean), named for the Yangtze river, which includes Austroasiatic and Hmong–Mien.
 In a different direction, the Dené–Caucasian hypothesis links Sino-Tibetan to languages of Siberia (Dene–Yeniseian) and the Caucasus (North Caucasian or Macro-Caucasian). On the basis of lexicostatistics, Sergei Starostin additionally hypothesized an even larger Dené–Daic macrofamily which incorporates both Dené–Caucasian and Austric as primary branches.

Genetic similarities between the peoples of East and Southeast Asia have led some scholars such as George van Driem to speculate about "Haplogroup O languages".

Proto-languages

Proto-Austronesian  
Proto-Malayo-Polynesian  
Proto-Visayan language 
Proto-Malayic language 
Proto-Chamic language 
Proto-Oceanic  
Proto-Polynesian 
Proto-Kra–Dai
Proto-Kra 
Proto-Kam–Sui 
Proto-Hlai 
Proto-Tai 
Proto-Austroasiatic 
Proto-Palaungic
Proto-Khmeric
Proto-Aslian
Proto-Munda
Proto-Sino-Tibetan language
Old Chinese language 
Proto-Tibeto-Burman 
Proto-Loloish 
Proto-Karenic
Proto-Hmong–Mien 
Proto-Hmongic language 
Proto-Mienic language

Comparison
The following table compares the phonemic inventories of various recently reconstructed proto-languages of Southeast Asia.

Maps of language families

See also
Languages of China
SEAlang Library
Writing systems of Southeast Asia
:Category:Linguists of Southeast Asian languages
:Category:Linguists of Austronesian languages
Vocabulary lists of Mainland Southeast Asian languages (Wiktionary)

References

Further reading

External links
 Hartmann, John (Professor of Thai). "Outline: Spoken and Written Languages of Southeast Asia." Northern Illinois University.
 Migliazza, Brian. 2004. Southeast Asia Language Families.

Languages of Southeast Asia
Southeast Asian